XXII Brigade, Royal Field Artillery was a brigade of the Royal Field Artillery which served in the First World War.

It was composed of the 104th, 105th, and 106th Batteries, and on mobilisation in August 1914, it was stationed in South Africa. It returned to the United Kingdom and was attached to the 7th Infantry Division in October. It saw service with the 7th Division throughout the war.

35th (Howitzer) Battery joined the Brigade in July 1916.

External links
Royal Field Artillery Brigades
7th Division order of battle
The British Army: 1914, Mark Conrad, 1996. (on archive.org)

Notes

References

Royal Field Artillery brigades
Artillery units and formations of World War I